Mount Victor Station is a pastoral lease currently operating as a sheep station located about  east of Hawker and  west of Broken Hill in the state of South Australia,

The property is stocked with 32,000 poll merino sheep and 120 cattle.

The property was established by Dr C. G. Hawker prior to 1859, one of many holdings passed onto his children following his death in 1895.
Mount Victor was one of many properties owned by Michael Seymour Hawker along with Bungaree, Partacoona, McCoy's Well and Sturt's Meadow.

The station was acquired in 1971 by H.G. MacLachlan of the Jumbuck Pastoral Company who still owned it in 2012.

The land occupying the extent of the Mount Victor pastoral lease was gazetted as a locality by the Government of South Australia on 26 April 2013  under the name 'Mount Victor Station'.  The term 'station' was added to prevent duplication of the locality name within Australia.

See also
List of ranches and stations

References

Stations (Australian agriculture)
Pastoral leases in South Australia
Far North (South Australia)